Boca Del Rio (also known as La Isla Bonita) is an area located in San Pedro Town in the northern part of Belize near San Juan (St. John). In English, its name means "Mouth Of The River."

References

Populated places in Belize District
Belize Rural South